Farlington may refer to the following places in the United Kingdom:

Farlington, Hampshire, in the suburbs of Portsmouth
Farlington, North Yorkshire